Josef Hnaníček (born 28 December 1986) is a Czech footballer who plays as a defender or midfielder for Znojmo.

Career

Hnaníček started his career with Czech fourth tier side Slavičín, helping them earn promotion to the Czech third tier. In 2010, Hnaníček signed for Znojmo in the Czech second tier, where he made 96 appearances and scored 6 goals, helping them earn promotion to the Czech top flight. On 6 March 2011, he debuted for Znojmo during a 2-1 win over Sparta B. On 19 October 2011, Hnaníček scored his first goal for Znojmo during a 1-4 loss to Sparta (Prague). In 2016, he signed for Czech top flight club Zlín, helping them win the 2016–17 Czech Cup and qualify for the 2017–18 UEFA Europa League. Before the second half of 2021–22, Hnaníček returned to Znojmo in the Czech third tier.

References

External links

 

Association football midfielders
1986 births
1. SC Znojmo players
1. FK Příbram players
Czech First League players
Czech National Football League players
SFC Opava players
FC Fastav Zlín players
Czech footballers
Living people
Association football defenders
Sportspeople from Zlín